Tetteh is both a surname and a given name. Notable people with the name include:

Surname:
Abdul Aziz Tetteh (born 1990), Ghanaian footballer
Alfred Tetteh (born 1975), Ghanaian boxer
Benjamin Tetteh (born 1997), Ghanaian footballer
David Tetteh (born 1985), Ghanaian-Kyrgyz footballer
David Tetteh (boxer) (born 1971), Ghanaian boxer
Emmanuel Tetteh (born 1974), Ghanaian footballer
Ezekiel Tetteh (born 1992), Ghanaian footballer
Hanna Tetteh (born 1967), Ghanaian barrister and politician
Joe Tetteh (1941–2002), Ghanaian boxer
Michael Tetteh (born 1989), Ghanaian footballer
Osah Bernardinho Tetteh (born 1996), Ghanaian footballer
Sellas Tetteh (born 1956), Ghanaian footballer and manager
Sly Tetteh (died 2011), Ghanaian footballer and manager
Stephen Tetteh (born 1982), Ghanaian footballer
Sulemanu Tetteh (born 1992), Ghanaian boxer

Given name:
Tetteh Adzedu (born 1949), Ghanaian fashion designer
Tetteh Nortey (born 1990), Ghanaian footballer
Tetteh Quarshie (1842–1892), Ghanaian agriculturalist